Dan McDonnell is an American college baseball coach who has been the head coach of the Louisville Cardinals since the start of the 2007 season.  As of the end of the 2017 season, Louisville has a 646-266 (.708 winning percentage) in 15 seasons record under McDonnell and has appeared in five College World Series (2007, 2013, 2014, 2017, 2019), 7 super regionals, and 10 NCAA Tournaments. Under McDonnell, the Cardinals have won two Big East Tournaments and four Big East regular season titles. McDonnell was one game away in 2015 from leading his Louisville Cardinals to three straight College World Series appearances. The College World Series is the final eight teams in the NCAA tournament, and it is played in Omaha, Nebraska. McDonnell, in his team's first three years in the Atlantic Coast Conference, has led his team to 3 division titles and 2 conference titles.

McDonnell grew up in Rye Brook, New York, and attended Port Chester High School. McDonnell played college baseball at The Citadel from 1989 to 1992.  He appeared in the 1990 College World Series with the Bulldogs. Following his playing career, McDonnell was an assistant coach at The Citadel from 1993 to 2000. He was an assistant at Ole Miss from 2001 to 2006.

Head coaching record

See also
 List of current NCAA Division I baseball coaches

References

Year of birth missing (living people)
Living people
Baseball second basemen
Louisville Cardinals baseball coaches
Ole Miss Rebels baseball coaches
The Citadel Bulldogs baseball coaches
The Citadel Bulldogs baseball players
People from Rye Brook, New York
Baseball coaches from New York (state)